Mărișel is a commune in Cluj County, Transylvania, Romania. It is composed of a single village, Mărișel.

Demographics 
According to the census from 2011 there was a total population of 1,468 people living in this commune. Of this population, 99.99% are ethnic Romanians.

Natives 
Pelaghia Roșu

References

Atlasul localităților județului Cluj (Cluj County Localities Atlas), Suncart Publishing House, Cluj-Napoca, 

Communes in Cluj County
Localities in Transylvania